Margaretha Christina Verheus (1905-1990) was a Dutch artist.

Biography 
Verheus was born on 16 November 1905 in Amsterdam. She studied with Henri Frédéric Boot and Huib Luns. She was married to the painter Willem August van der Colk. Her work was included in the 1939 exhibition and sale Onze Kunst van Heden (Our Art of Today) at the Rijksmuseum in Amsterdam.

Verheus died on 15 September 1990 in Haarlem. Her work is in the collection of the Rijksmuseum.

References

1905 births
1990 deaths
Artists from Amsterdam
20th-century Dutch women artists